Moldova, officially the Republic of Moldova, competed at the 2020 Summer Olympics in Tokyo. Originally scheduled to take place from 24 July to 9 August 2020, the Games were postponed to 23 July to 8 August 2021, because of the COVID-19 pandemic. It was the nation's seventh consecutive appearance at the Summer Olympics in the post-Soviet era.

Medalists

Competitors
The following is the list of number of competitors in the Games.

Archery

One Moldovan archer qualified for the women's individual recurve by reaching the quarterfinal stage and obtaining one of the four available spots at the 2019 World Archery Championships in 's-Hertogenbosch, Netherlands. Another Moldovan archer scored a fourth-round triumph to book the last of seven available spots in the men's individual recurve at the 2021 Final Qualification Tournament in Paris, France.

Athletics

Moldovan athletes further achieved the entry standards, either by qualifying time or by world ranking, in the following track and field events (up to a maximum of 3 athletes in each event):

Track & road events

Field events

Canoeing

Sprint
Moldova qualified a boat in the women's C-2 200 m for the Games by topping the field of canoeists in the medal final at the 2021 European Canoe Sprint Qualification Regatta in Szeged, Hungary. Meanwhile, one additional boat was awarded to the Moldovan canoeist in the men's K-1 1000 m with a gold-medal triumph at the 2021 European Canoe Sprint Qualification Regatta.

Qualification Legend: FA = Qualify to final (medal); FB = Qualify to final B (non-medal)

Judo
 
Moldova entered two male judoka into the Olympic tournament based on the International Judo Federation Olympics Individual Ranking.

Shooting

Swimming

Moldovan swimmers further achieved qualifying standards in the following events (up to a maximum of 2 swimmers in each event at the Olympic Qualifying Time (OQT), and potentially 1 at the Olympic Selection Time (OST)):

Weightlifting

Moldova entered two weightlifters into the Olympic competition. Elena Cîlcic accepted a spare berth unused by the Tripartite Commission as the next highest-ranked weightlifter vying for qualification in the women's 87 kg category based on the IWF Absolute World Rankings.

Wrestling

Moldova qualified two wrestlers for each of the following classes into the Olympic competition. One of them finished among the top six to claim an Olympic slot in the women's freestyle 57 kg at the 2019 World Championships, while an additional license was awarded to the Moldovan wrestler, who progressed to the top two finals of the men's Greco-Roman 60 kg at the 2021 World Qualification Tournament in Sofia, Bulgaria.

Freestyle

Greco-Roman

References

Nations at the 2020 Summer Olympics
2020
2020 in Moldovan sport